Siddiqui are a Muslim community, found mainly in Pakistan, India and Bangladesh, and in communities in Saudi Arabia, Middle East Region and North African Region

It is also an Islamic-based common name in reference to Abu Bakr who was known as Al-Siddiq

Notable people with the name include:

Given name
Siddiqui Ahmed Khan (1914–?), Indian sarangi player

Surname

Siddiqui
Aafia Siddiqui (born 1972), Pakistani scientist
Abul Lais Siddiqui (1916–1994), Pakistani author, researcher, critic, linguist and scholar of Urdu literature and linguistics
Abdul Latif Siddiqui (born 1943), Bangladeshi politician, serving as a member of Jatiya Sangsad
Abdul Samad Siddiqui, Indian educationist, former Member of parliament (Rajya Sabha) from Hyderabad - Karnataka region
Adnan Siddiqui (born 1969), Pakistani actor and model
Aftab Siddiqui, Pakistani politician and member of the National Assembly of Pakistan
Ahmed Siddiqui (American youth) (born 1996), American of Pakistani descent who described being kidnapped with his mother and two younger siblings in March 2003
Akhtar Hameed Siddiqui (1947–2017), Bangladeshi politician who served as the Deputy Speaker of the Jatiya Sangsad
Ali Jehangir Siddiqui (born 1976), Pakistani politician, administrator and ambassador
Arifa Siddiqui, Pakistani actress
Asad Siddiqui, Pakistani actor
Ashraf Siddiqui (1927–2020), Bangladeshi poet, researcher, folklorist and essayist
Ataullah Siddiqui, British academic, Professor of Christian-Muslim Relations and Inter-Faith Understanding
Ausaf Umar Siddiqui (born 1966), also known as Omar Siddiqui, Pakistani business executive
Aziza Siddiqui (born c. 1983), Afghan women's rights activist
Bari Siddiqui (1954–2017), Bangladeshi singer-songwriter, flutist, and folk musician
Barkat Siddiqui, Pakistani television director, producer and actor
 (Faisal Siddiqui),Born 1979, Lahore, Famous Pakistani Businessman of Laboratory Scientific Supplies
Fawad Siddiqui, American actor, improvisational comedian, journalist and cartoonist
Hammad Siddiqui, Pakistani politician
Haroon Siddiqui, Indo-Canadian newspaper journalist, columnist and a former editor
Iqbal Siddiqui (born 1974), Indian cricketer
Islam A. Siddiqui, American lobbyist of Indian descent
Ishrat Ali Siddiqui, Indian gandhian, poet of Urdu literature and editor
Jahangir Siddiqui, Pakistani businessman and philanthropist
Javed Siddiqi (born 1942), Indian screenwriter, dialogue writer and playwright in Hindi and Urdu films 
Khalid Siddiqui (born 1958), Indian film and television actor
Khalid Maqbool Siddiqui, Pakistani politician and government minister
Kalim Siddiqui (1931-1996), Pakistani British writer and Islamic activist
Kamal Uddin Siddiqui, Bangladeshi economist and social scientist
Mohsin Siddiqui, Pakistani politician and businessman 
Mona Siddiqui (born 1963), British academic and professor of Islamic and Interreligious Studies 
Muhammad Alauddin Siddiqui (1936–2017), Islamic Sufi scholar from Nerian Sharif Azad Kashmir Pakistan
Muhammad Ali Siddiqui (1938–2013), Indian scholar of Urdu literature, educationist, literary critic and newspaper columnist
Muhammad Ibrahim Siddiqui, Indian Islamic scholar
Muhammad Shafi Siddiqui (born 1965), Pakistani jurist and Justice of the Sindh High Court
Muhammad Shoaib Siddiqui, Pakistani politician and Member of the Provincial Assembly of the Punjab
Muneeba Ali Siddiqui (born 1997), Pakistani female cricketer
Naeem Siddiqui (1916-2002), Pakistani Islamic scholar, writer and politician
Nasimuddin Siddiqui (born 1959), Indian Uttar Pradesh politician, member of Indian National Congress
Nawazuddin Siddiqui (born 1974), Indian film actor
Nazim Hussain Siddiqui (born 1940), Pakistani jurist who served as Chief Justice of the Supreme Court of Pakistan
Obaidur Rahman Siddiqui (born 1964), Indian historian
Qamar Siddiqui, Pakistani poet
Rasheed Ahmad Siddiqui (1892–1977), Urdu writer and a professor
Rauf Siddiqui, Pakistani politician and a Member of the Provincial Assembly of Sindh
Sadiya Siddiqui, Indian film and television actress
Sadaf Siddiqui (born 1985), Pakistani track and field sprint athlete
Saeeduzzaman Siddiqui (1939–2017), Pakistani jurist and legislator formerly served as the Chief Justice of Pakistan
Salimuzzaman Siddiqui (1897–1994), Pakistani organic chemist specialising in natural product chemistry
Sameer Siddiqui (born 1976), Indian writer
Saghar Siddiqui (1928-1974), Pakistani poet in Urdu
Shahid Siddiqui, member of the Rajya Sabha, the Upper House of the Indian Parliament representing the state of Uttar Pradesh
Shaukat Siddiqui (1923–2006), Pakistani writer of fiction
Shaukat Aziz Siddiqui (born 1959), Pakistani jurist and former senior Justice of the Islamabad High Court
Shakeel Siddiqui, Pakistani television stand-up comedian
Sultana Siddiqui, Pakistani television director, producer and businessperson
Tasneem Siddiqui, Pakistani politician and member of the National Assembly of Pakistan
Tooba Siddiqui, Pakistani model
Uroosa Siddiqui, Pakistani television actress and comedian
Zeeshan Siddiqui (born 1975), Pakistani-born Norwegian cricketer
Zillur Rahman Siddiqui (1928–2014), Bangladeshi writer, academic and educationist
Mohammad Iftikhar Ali Khan Siddiqui Pataudi (1910–1952), 8th Nawab of Pataudi

Siddiqi
Abul Hasan Siddiqi (1943–2020), Indian mathematician and Professor of Applied Mathematics
Abdul Wahab Siddiqi (1942–1994), Pakistani Sunni Muslim religious scholar and Sufi master
Aijaz Siddiqi (1911–1978), Urdu writer and poet
Anis Siddiqi (born 1959), Pakistani cricketer
Asif Azam Siddiqi, Bangladeshi American space historian
A. Y. B. I. Siddiqi (1945–2021), Bangladeshi Inspector General of Police 
Hafiz Siddiqi (1931–2018), Bangladeshi academic
Imran Siddiqi (born 1957), Indian geneticist
Irfan Siddiqi, American physicist and currently a Professor of Physics at the Quantum Nanoscience
Jameela Siddiqi, British novelist, journalist, broadcaster, linguist and specialist in Indian classical music and poetry
Javaid Siddiqi (born 1977), American educator 
Javed Siddiqi (born 1942), Indian Hindi and Urdu screenwriter, dialogue writer and playwright
Jawed Siddiqi, Pakistani British computer scientist and software engineer
Kamal Siddiqi, Australian journalist of Pakistani origin
Kashif Siddiqi (born 1986), English footballerof Indian descent 
L. K. Siddiqi (1939–2014), Bangladeshi politician and philanthropist and member of parliament
Manzoor Ul Haq Siddiqi (1917–2004), Indian educationist, historian and an author**Muhammad Abdul Aleem Siddiqi (1892–1954), Indian Islamic scholar
Mustafizur Rahman Siddiqi (1925–1992), Bangladeshi entrepreneur, politician and diplomat
Nasir Siddiqi (born 1965), Pakistani Emirati cricketer
Nawab Khwaja Abid Siddiqi, also known as Kilich Khan, Nawab under Aurangzeb
Ravish Siddiqi (1911–1971), Urdu Ghazal and Nazm writer
Shujauddin Siddiqi (1919–2003), Indian cricketer
Sumaiya Siddiqi (born 1988), Pakistani cricketer
Obaid Siddiqi (1932–2013), Indian scientific research professor
Zaka Siddiqi (1937–2003), Urdu poet and a critic of Urdu and Persian poetry

Siddiq
Asad Siddiq (1996-2020), Member of Barnoldswick Siddiq dynasty
Tariq Zia Siddiq (born 1970), Member of Barnoldswick Siddiq dynasty
Nazia Shaheen Siddiq (born 1978-1983), Member of Barnoldswick Siddiq dynasty
Sajid Siddiq, Member of Barnoldswick Siddiq dynasty

See also
Amblyseius siddiqui, a species of mite in the family Phytoseiidae

Surnames
Urdu-language surnames
Pakistani names